Narambi railway station was a single platform located on the corner of Narambi Road and Richardson Drive, Mornington, Victoria, Australia. After it closed, some of the platform infrastructure was reused at the new site of Mornington railway station.

For a brief period of time before the opening of the new Mornington railway station, Narambi was used as the terminus of the reopened part of the line run by the Mornington Railway Preservation Society, with tickets only being sold at Moorooduc.

References

Disused railway stations in Melbourne
Railway stations closed in 1981